"Strip Jack" is a 2006 episode of STV's Rebus television series. It was the third episode broadcast in the show's third season, and starred Ken Stott in the title role. The episode was based on the Ian Rankin novel of the same name.

Plot
When a brothel is raided, one of those found there is Gregor Jack, a millionaire with a social conscience, and someone Rebus regards as "one of the good guys". Rebus believes he was set up, and unofficially looks into the case. Meanwhile a woman is murdered near the river, and shortly after, Jack's wife is found murdered in similar circumstances. The answer to the mysteries is found to lie in Jack's past.

Cast
Ken Stott as DI John Rebus
Claire Price as DS Siobhan Clarke
Gary Lewis as Gregor Jack
Emma Currie as Angela

Footnotes

External links

2006 British television episodes
Rebus (TV series) episodes